Shturmovshchina (last-minute rush,  storming) was a common Soviet work practice of frantic and overtime work at the end of a planning period in order to fulfill the planned production target. The practice usually gave rise to products of poor quality at the end of a planning cycle.

The cycle of shturmovshchina, associated with the tradition of monthly targets (on which bonuses and managers' positions depend), is described as follows. Due to the planned economy, required materials and tools were not always available on time, and the work slowed as a result, or workers might have been reassigned to do something else, with the expectation that the job would be done when the materials arrive. However, when the end of a month neared, management was placed under pressure, substitute materials and improvised tools were used, and the workers were expected to produce the expected product in time. All this abruptly ended at the end of the month. At the beginning of the next month, the workers slacken to recover from the previous storm, thereby continuing the next cycle.

The process is known to consist of three stages:
 Spiachka ('hibernation") – this was the first third of the planned period. Workers are not very efficient, mostly because there are no orders to do anything;
 Raskachka ("buildup") – at this stage it is more or less known what should be done, but there is too much time ahead, and during that time the requirements may change, as well as the management;
 Goriachka ("fever") – this is the last stage of the planned period; by the end of this stage the product is supposed to be ready, or the management may be reprimanded; workers work overtime.

See also
Charrette
Project management
Death march (project management)
Stakhanovite movement
Udarnik
Socialist emulation
State quality mark of the USSR

References

 Tomorrow Is Three Suits – TIME (access 23 June 2008)

Economy of the Soviet Union
Former communist economies
Soviet phraseology
Time management
Production planning
History of manufacturing